San Nicola Manfredi is a comune (municipality) in the Province of Benevento in the Italian region Campania, located about 50 km northeast of Naples and about 8 km southeast of Benevento.

San Nicola Manfredi borders the following municipalities: Benevento, Ceppaloni, Chianche, Montefusco, Paduli, Petruro Irpino, San Giorgio del Sannio, San Martino Sannita, Sant'Angelo a Cupolo, Torrioni.

References

Cities and towns in Campania